Ella-Lee Lahav (born 2 June 2003), known as Ella-Lee, is an Israeli singer. In 2019 she became famous following her second place at the seventh season of Israel's HaKokhav HaBa LaErovizion (Rising Star to the Eurovision), the Israeli national selection for the Eurovision Song Contest 2020. In June 2020, on her 17th birthday, she released her debut single "Zot Ani", the single was ranking high on the Apple UK playlist and topped the Media Forest airplay chart.

Early life 
Ella Lahav was born and raised in Shoham, Israel, to a family of Ashkenazi Jewish descent. Her parents are Yannai and Hagit, and she has two sisters.

Towards an appearance in television singing competition she changed her first name from Ella to Ella-Lee, after consultation with a numerologist.

In February 2022, she was enlisted to the Israel Defense Forces.

Career

2019–2020: HaKokhav HaBa LaErovizion (Rising Star to the Eurovision) 
In 2019, she auditioned for the seventh season of the Israeli singing competition Rising Star to the Eurovision (HaKokhav HaBa LaErovizion), Israel's national selection for the European Eurovision Song Contest, with "You Don't Own Me" by Saygrace. After receiving 96% of the votes, she advanced to the second stage of the competition in which she sang "Into You" by Ariana Grande. In January 2020, she performed "Hey Mama" by David Guetta and won a duel with Nicky Goldstein. After that, she performed a duet with Orr Amrami Brockman to "Señorita" by Shawn Mendes and Camila Cabello and got many praises from the judges and audience. In semi-final she performed "Only Girl (In the World)" and "Royals".

The last song Lahav performed in the competition was "Roar" by Katy Perry. After receiving 182 points from the judges and audience, Lahav won the second place, losing to Eden Alene.

2020: Debut single and other projects 
In March 2020, she appeared with fellow runner up of HaKokhav HaBa Orr Amrami Brockman in an advertising to Israeli telecommunications company Bezeq, along with the presenter of the company commercials, Israeli singer Gidi Gov. In April she performed with Amrami Brockman in Israel Independence national ceremony, held in Mount Herzl.

On 2 June 2020, her 17th birthday, she released her debut single "Zot Ani", produced by Johnny Goldstein. Just days after its release, the single became hit by reaching the top of Media Forest's airplay chart and ranking high on the Apple Music UK playlist Glitch.

On 15 November 2020, she released a second single titled "Ma Atta Rotse?".

In 2022 she played at the Israeli series שומקום (סדרת טלוויזיה) on TeenNick. There she met Philip Shaolov, her current boyfriend.

Discography

Singles

References

External links

2003 births
Living people
21st-century Israeli women singers
Jewish Israeli musicians
Jewish women singers
21st-century Israeli Jews
Israeli pop singers
K-pop singers
Israeli Ashkenazi Jews